The Hymno da Carta (modern Portuguese spelling: Hino da Carta) was officially proclaimed the national anthem of the Kingdom of Portugal in May 1834. It was composed by D. Pedro IV, King Pedro IV of Portugal (also Emperor Pedro I of Brazil). "Carta" stands for the Constitutional Charter which Peter IV granted to Portugal. The anthem remained officially in place until 19 July 1911, nine months after Portugal became a republic, and was replaced by A Portuguesa.

Lyrics

See also
A Portuguesa
Hymno Patriótico

References

External links
 Music Sheet 
 Download the anthem Hino da Carta

Historical national anthems
Royal anthems
Portuguese anthems
Kingdom of Portugal
Portuguese-language songs
National anthem compositions in E-flat major
Portuguese patriotic songs